Karl Ferdinand Werner (Neunkirchen, Saarland 1924 – Tegernsee 2008) was a German historian. He particularly studied historiography, the Early Middle Ages and the origins of European nobility.

Works 

People from Neunkirchen, Saarland
1924 births
2008 deaths
École pratique des hautes études alumni
20th-century German historians
Heidelberg University alumni
Commanders Crosses of the Order of Merit of the Federal Republic of Germany
Members of the Bavarian Academy of Sciences
Academic staff of the University of Mannheim
Corresponding members of the Académie des Inscriptions et Belles-Lettres